Wembdon is a semi-rural village near Bridgwater, in Somerset, England.

Wembdon is now home to an Anglican church, a small shop (combined with the post office), a pub and a small garage.

History
Wembdon was listed in the Domesday Book of 1086 as having "5 villagers and 6 smallholders with four ploughs".

The name Wembdon is believed to mean "Huntsman's Hill", referring to Wembdon Hill itself where Saxon* burials have been discovered. These are believed to be British burials which date to the Saxon period. Wembdon Hill is also the site of St. Johns Well, which was renowned for its healing powers from the 15th century onwards.

In 2002 a northern distributor road for Bridgwater was built to the south of the village to ease traffic congestion in Bridgwater town centre.  The road had been part of local town planning since the 1980s, and building proceeded despite some local resistance.

Governance
The parish council has responsibility for local issues, including setting an annual precept (local rate) to cover the council’s operating costs and producing annual accounts for public scrutiny. The parish council evaluates local planning applications and works with the local police, district council officers, and neighbourhood watch groups on matters of crime, security, and traffic. The parish council's role also includes initiating projects for the maintenance and repair of parish facilities, as well as consulting with the district council on the maintenance, repair, and improvement of highways, drainage, footpaths, public transport, and street cleaning. Conservation matters (including trees and listed buildings) and environmental issues are also the responsibility of the council.

The village falls within the Non-metropolitan district of Sedgemoor, which was formed on 1 April 1974 under the Local Government Act 1972, having previously been part of Bridgwater Rural District, which is responsible for local planning and building control, local roads, council housing, environmental health, markets and fairs, refuse collection and recycling, cemeteries and crematoria, leisure services, parks, and tourism.

Somerset County Council is responsible for running the largest and most expensive local services such as education, social services, libraries, main roads, public transport, policing and  fire services, trading standards, waste disposal and strategic planning.

It is also part of the Bridgwater and West Somerset county constituency represented in the House of Commons of the Parliament of the United Kingdom. It elects one Member of Parliament (MP) by the first past the post system of election, and was part of the South West England constituency of the European Parliament prior to Britain leaving the European Union in January 2020, which elected seven MEPs using the d'Hondt method of party-list proportional representation.

Religious sites
St George's Church was granted by William Testard, lord of Wembdon Manor, to St John's Hospital, Bridgwater in 1284.  The church was badly damaged by fire in March 1868, and as the certificate for fire insurance had expired, had to be rebuilt with significant local aid.

Education
A Church of England VC Primary school (Wembdon St. Georges) can  be found in the village.

Culture
Wembdon Village Day occurs towards the end of August every year, centred on competitions involving arts and crafts, fruit and vegetables, baking, jam making and wine making and many other events. It takes place on the playing field and nearby Parish centre building.  A large car boot sale is also in place on the day and local radio station Quay West 107.4 conduct a live show from a stage during the event.

On the Saturday closest to 5 November, Guy Fawkes Night, a bonfire is set up on the playing field, and a fireworks display is shown during the evening.

St George's Parish Centre opposite the church is the venue for many village activities. These include Scouts and Guides, a nursery school and the meetings of the Wembdon Community Association.

Further reading
Victoria County History, Vol.6, 1992, Wembdon: Manors and other estates, pp. 325-330

References

Villages in Sedgemoor
Somerset Levels
Civil parishes in Somerset